Veronika "Vera" Schmidt (4 May 1982) is a Hungarian pop singer-songwriter who rose to popularity after finishing fifth in the Hungarian version of Pop Idol Megasztár. She is a student in Eötvös Loránd University, Budapest.

Biography

Early life 

Vera Schmidt was born in Miskolc. Her father taught her to play the guitar. After that, she and her sister often performed in school programs. After graduating from Ferenc Földes Secondary School, she formed her first rock band. They often played in Miskolc and other cities around Miskolc.

Discography

Albums

 Megasztár (2004)
 Best Of Megasztár (2004)
 Nézhetnélek (2005)

When Vera Schmidt worked on own album, Jamie Wichester and Róbert Hrutka helped her.

Pop Idol Performances

Top 11: "Nézhetnélek" by Vera Schmidt 
Top 11: "Csillagdal" by Pierrot 
Top 10: "Kiss from a Rose" by Seal
Top 9:  "Norwegian Wood (This Bird Has Flown)" by the Beatles
Top 9:  "Let It Be" by the Beatles
Top 8:  "You'll Be in My Heart" by Phil Collins
Top 8:  "We Have All the Time in the World" by Louis Armstrong
Top 7:  "I Still Haven't Found What I'm Looking For" by U2
Top 7:  "We are the World" written by Michael Jackson and Lionel Richie
Top 6:  "Thank You" by Dido
Top 5:  "Minden szónál többet ér egy dal" by Peter Máté  
Top 5:  "Várj, míg felkel majd a nap" by Ferenc Demjén 
Top 5:  "Egyszer véget ér..." by Peter Máté 
Top 5:  "Fújom a dalt" by Peter Máté 
Top 4:  "Somethin' Stupid" by Robbie Williams and Nicole Kidman
Top 4:  "Another Day in Paradise" by Phil Collins

Other performances in Pop Idol finale and tour:
 "Sweet Dreams" by Patsy Cline
 "It's Your Life" by Jamie Winchester

Vera Schmidt's band

The Vera Schmidt's band members: Vera Schmidt: singing and guitar, Zoltán Tóth: keyboard, Gergő Juhász: bass, Máté Hámori: guitars, Ákos Kottler : drums.

The first album "Nézhetnélek" songs

 Ébredésre
 Ne bántsd őt
 Süvít a szél
 Késői találkozás
 Nézhetnélek
 Írj nekem egy dalt
 Életem szerelme
 Szeretsz és féltesz
 Valaki hitesse el
 Ne veszítsd el
 Vízcseppek

Tours
 Pop Idol Arena Tour 2004

See also
Hungarian pop

External links 

Vera Schmidt Official site

1982 births
Living people
21st-century Hungarian women singers
Hungarian songwriters
Idols (franchise) participants
Lyricists
People from Miskolc